"Lovin' Me" is a song by Slovene duo Maraaya. It was written by Raay, Marjetka Vovk and Charlie Mason. This is their first single released on 28 April 2014 by Bip Records and Dance and Love.

Background

iTunes 
In 2014 when they released their first single "Lovin' Me". This song was a big success at iTunes music charts in Belgium, Germany, Italy and Slovenia.

International success 
It was also listed on Polish "Bravo Hits Zima 2015" compilation. This song was among top ten selling singles in Italy and was rankend at 34th place at German DJ's Dance Top 100 singles chart.

"Lovin' Me" peak positions at the official singles charts: it was ranked on 13th place at the Slovenian SloTop50 chart, on 52nd at the Italian FIMI chart and on 83rd at the Belgian (Flanders) Ultratip 100 chart.

Formats and track listing 

SWE" CD promo single
"Lovin' Me" (Radio Edit) – 3:49
"Lovin' Me" (Tobix Remix) – 3:29

NED" CD promo single
"Lovin' Me" (Radio Edit) – 3:45

Credits and personnel 

Raay – music, producer
Marjetka Vovk – lyrics, vocals
Charlie Mason – lyrics
Bris Perme – producer

Charts

Weekly charts

Year-end charts

Release history

References 

2014 songs
2014 singles
Songs with lyrics by Charlie Mason (lyricist)